The 2018 IFA Shield was the 122nd edition of the IFA Shield. The tournament was designed as a U19 youth football tournament since 2015. 8 clubs participated in final round in the edition.

Venue
All the matches were held at Barasat Stadium, East Bengal Ground, Mohun Bagan Ground and Howrah Stadium.

Qualifying round
14 teams participated in the qualifying round and Bengal Football Academy as the winners of qualifiers. FC Pune City later withdrew from the tournament and were replaced by runners-up of qualifying round, SAIL (Burnpur) Academy.

Final round

Group A

Group B

Semi-finals

Final

References

IFA Shield seasons
Ifa Shield
Ifa Shield